John Kevin Raphael "Jack" Doolan (14 June 1927 – 29 January 1995) was an Australian politician. He was the Labor member for Victoria River in the Northern Territory Legislative Assembly from 1977 to 1983.  He is best known for having toppled Majority Leader Goff Letts in the 1977 election—one of the few times that a major-party leader in Australia has been defeated in his own electorate. Doolan was re-elected in 1980, but had been removed from the Labor caucus by the 1983 election and recontested and lost as an Independent Labor candidate.

|}

Prior to his election, Doolan worked as a patrol officer with the Australian Government Department of Aboriginal Affairs.

References

1927 births
1995 deaths
Members of the Northern Territory Legislative Assembly
Australian Labor Party members of the Northern Territory Legislative Assembly
20th-century Australian politicians